Lithuanians in Belarus have a long history, as Belarus was part of Lithuania for more than half a millennium from the 13th century onwards. The land of what is now Belarus was originally inhabited by Balts, while Slavs arrived to those lands during the late Early Middle Ages.

According to the 2009 census, there were 19,091 ethnic Lithuanians in Belarus. Lithuanians are most significantly concentrated in Grodno and western Vitebsk regions, which border Lithuania, but concentrations of Lithuanians can also be found in Belarus' eastern regions.

History 
The history of ethnic Balts in what is now Belarus is evidenced by numerous archaeological finds, hydronyms and toponyms. The territory of modern Belarus was inhabited solely by Balts from at least 2nd millennium BC. From the later part of the 1st millennium AD until the advent of Slavicisation, the numbers of Balts decreased, although isolated islands that maintained their culture remained.

Grand Duchy of Lithuania 

Throughout the existence of the Grand Duchy of Lithuania, the territory of modern Belarus was inhabited by many Lithuanians. Written sources mention that Lithuanians lived in the Orsha District. In the 15th and 16th centuries, the districts of Lida, Kreva, Ashmyany, Smarhon, Myadzyel, Vileyka, Vidzy and Braslaw, were Lithuanian. Some of the inhabitants of these areas were Polonized, while another part became Belarusified during the 16th to the 19th centuries. Until the 19th century Grodno with its surrounding vicinities belonged to the Lithuanian ethnographic area.

From the 13th century to the end of the 18th century, all of modern Belarus belonged to the Grand Duchy of Lithuania.

Russian Empire 
During the 19th century and until the early 20th century, Belarus was governed by the Russian Empire.

20th century 
In the 20th century, Lithuanians remained in some villages within the districts of Voranava, Astravyets, Iwye and Braslaw (respectively). In 1915, as many Lithuanians fled through Belarus eastwards due to the ongoing World War I, so in Minsk and elsewhere, there existed chapters of the Lithuanian Society for the Relief of War Sufferers.

Interwar 
During 1918–1920, the Lithuanian inhabitants of the eastern ethnographic Lithuania, which is now in Belarus, sought that those territories would be once more part of Lithuania. The Belarusian Democratic Republic was a failed Belarusian attempt at independence in the aftermath of World War I, whose territorial claims included ethnically Lithuanian lands. However, Eastern Belorussia was de facto occupied by Soviet Russia by 1920, which created the Byelorussian Soviet Socialist Republic. In December 1922, the Byelorussian SSR became one of the Soviet republics and formally one of the Soviet Union's founders. In 1920–1939, Western Belorussia was ruled by the Second Polish Republic. After 1939, after the Soviet invasion of Poland, a part of the ethnically Lithuanian lands like  (Apsas),  (Pelesa), Radun (Rodūnia, Rodūnė),  (Gėliūnai),  (Gervėčiai),  (Girios),  (Rimdžiūnai), and other villages, which were inhabited by 24,000 Lithuanians until World War II, were included into the territory that is now Belarus.

From 1927 to 1944 in Belarus, there were four Communist publications in Lithuanian. To spread Communist ideas, there was a Lithuanian bureau that was part of the Department for Agitation and Propaganda of the Central Committee of the Communist Party of Byelorussia in 1927–30. Then, in 1931–38, the bureau was part of the Central Committee of the Communist Party of Western Belorussia. In 1927–32, there was a Lithuanian section in Byelorussia's Proletarian Writer's Association. In 1927–37, there were Lithuanian sectors in Academy of Sciences of the Byelorussian SSR and the Government's publication company. The Minsk Radio had weekly Lithuanian radio programs during 1928–37. In 1928, there were ten Lithuanian primary schools throughout what is now Belarus.

World War II 
During World War II, in the ethnically Lithuanian lands that were assigned to Generalbezirk Litauen, Lithuanian schools were established and Church services in Lithuanian were revived. At the end of summer in 1941 Lithuanian self-defense units, wearing the Lithuanian military uniforms, appeared in Grodno and were commanded by major Albinas Levickas. Subsequently, priest Viktoras Kurgonas established the Lithuanian National Committee in Grodno and collaborated with Albinas Levickas. Both of them fluently spoke German and supported starving Lithuanians. At the time, the St. Mary's Church (Vytautas the Great's Church) was allocated to the Lithuanians in Grodno and Lithuanian religious services were held in it.

However, all schools were closed  in the aftermath of World War II with the Soviet re-occupation of Lithuania.

During the Soviet occupation, most of the prominent Lithuanian cultural and political figures were executed or deported to Siberia, including the Lithuanian communists.

1945–1990 
From 1957, there were Lithuanian language lessons in eight local schools in the districts of Gervėčiai and Pelesa, but their number was reduced and they remained only in Gervėčiai, Pelesa and Girios.

Current situation (1990-present) 

According to the census of 2009, there were 19,091 Lithuanians in Belarus.

Language 
The usage of the Lithuanian language in Belarus has declined significantly from a peak in 1959. Originally at 77%, the number of Lithuanian Belarusians who considered Lithuanian their native language had declined to 52% by the 1999 census, and to 31% by the 2009 census. The Russian language (and, to an extent, the Belarusian language) have filled the gap to replace Lithuanian, with 39% of Lithuanians speaking Russian natively and 26% speaking Belarusian natively.

Only 5% of Lithuanians in Belarus spoke the Lithuanian language at home according to the 2009 census, but a significant divide exists between rural and urban Lithuanian populations; roughly 13% of rural Belarusian Lithuanians use Lithuanian at home, versus only 2% of urban Belarusian Lithuanians. A plurality of the rural population (42%) uses the Belarusian language at home, while most of the urban population (79%) speaks Russian.

, according  to the Code of the Republic of Belarus on Education, article 82, there is no general  education in the languages of national minorities; their languages and literature will be studied as an optional subject in separate groups and classes.

Notes

References

Further reading
Rasa Paukštytė - Šakniene, Etnografinių tyrimų laukas už Lietuvos ribų: šeima ir jos papročiai, (The field of ethnographic research outside Lithuania: the family and its customs) LITHUANISTICS, 2019. Vol. 65. No. 2(116), p. 124–139; contais section about research of Lithuanian ethnic lands in Belarus

Ethnic groups in Belarus
Belarus